El Padrino is a 2004 American film directed by Damian Chapa. The film stars Chapa himself, depicting his life from a child, to his becoming the head of a notorious American narcotics syndicate. Co-starring in the film are: Jennifer Tilly, Faye Dunaway, Robert Wagner, Tommy 'Tiny' Lister, Gary Busey, Joanna Pacula, Rachel Hunter, and Stacy Keach.

Written and produced by Troy Barker, Damian Chapa and Carlton Holder. The film's producers are Warren Barnhart, Berta Bennett, Chuck Binder, Chris Chanowski, Edmund Druilhet, Roffe Joundour, Alex Pinedo, H. Evie Ryland, Robert Star, Harry Sutherland and Lloyd White.

References

External links

2004 films
2004 crime thriller films
2004 crime drama films
American crime drama films
American crime thriller films
Films about drugs
2000s English-language films
Films directed by Damian Chapa
2000s American films
Hood films